Dunderbeist (sort of Norwegian for "Noisy Beast") is a heavy metal band from Hedmark in Norway. The band was formed by former members of Krace, KITE and Stonegard. Dunderbeist has been recording since 2008 with several albums and extensive touring. The six-piece band now releases material outside Norway following its first international album, Black Arts & Crooked Tails.

Songs of the Buried continued where Black arts & Crooked Tails left off, but is darker, heavier and more progressive, both musically and lyrically. Death was a recurring theme on the album, portraying death as the end of something but the beginning of something else.

The band's albums were recorded in Dunderbeist's own "pigsty" studio in Hamar, Norway, and mixed by the guitarist Fredrik Ryberg. The mastering was carried out by Alan Douches of Mastodon, Converge, Kvelertak fame.

Dunderbeist's work is released by the Indie Recordings label.

Members 
 Torgrim Torve - lead vocals, guitar
 Åsmund Snortheim - vocals
 Fredrik Ryberg - guitar
 Kristian Liljan - bass guitar
 Ronny Flissundet - guitar
 John Birkeland Hansen - drums

Discography 
2008: Second Hand Theft 
2009: 8 crows & Counting
2010: Rovmord (EP) 
2011: Dunderbeist 
2012: Black Arts & Crooked Tails
2012: Songs Of The Buried
2015: Hyklere
2017: Tvilja (EP)
2021: URO

References

External links 
Dunderbeist at MySpace

Norwegian heavy metal musical groups
Musical groups from Hedmark
Musical groups with year of establishment missing